James Hook may refer to:

 Captain Hook, the villain of J. M. Barrie's play and novel Peter Pan
 James Hook (composer) (1746–1827), English composer and organist
 James Hook (priest) (1771–1828), English priest, Dean of Worcester
 James Clarke Hook (1819–1907), English painter
 James Schley Hook (1824–1907), American jurist from Georgia
 James Hook (rugby union) (born 1985), Welsh international rugby union player